Ricky Wilson (born July 16, 1964) is a retired American professional basketball player born in Hampton, Virginia.

A 6'3" guard from George Mason University, Wilson was selected by the Chicago Bulls in the third round of the 1986 NBA draft. He played one season (1987–88) in the NBA as a member of the New Jersey Nets and San Antonio Spurs, averaging 5.2 points per game and 2.9 assists per game.

Notes

1964 births
Living people
American expatriate basketball people in Germany
American men's basketball players
Basketball players from Virginia
Bayer Giants Leverkusen players
Capital Region Pontiacs players
Chicago Bulls draft picks
George Mason Patriots men's basketball players
Grand Rapids Hoops players
Mississippi Jets players
New Jersey Nets players
Point guards
Quad City Thunder players
Rockford Lightning players
San Antonio Spurs players
Sportspeople from Hampton, Virginia
Wichita Falls Texans players
American expatriate basketball people in the Philippines
Philippine Basketball Association imports
San Miguel Beermen players